This is a list of Iranian football transfers for the 2011 summer transfer window. Only moves featuring at least one Iran Pro League or Azadegan League club are listed.

The summer transfer window opened on 9 June 2011 and was closed at midnight on 23 July 2011. Players without a club may join one at any time, either during or in between transfer windows. Clubs can also sign players on loan at any point during the season. If need be, clubs may sign a goalkeeper on an emergency loan, if all others are unavailable.

Iran Pro League

Damash Gilan

In:

Out:

Esteghlal

In:

Out:

Fajr Sepasi

In:

Out:

Foolad

In:

Out:

Malavan

In:

Out:

Mes Kerman

In:

Out:

Mes Sarcheshmeh

In:

Out:

Naft Tehran

In:

Out:

Persepolis

In:

Out:

Rah Ahan

In:

Out:

Saba Qom

In:

Out:

Saipa

In:

Out:

Sanat Naft

In:

Out:

Sepahan

In:

Out:

Shahin Bushehr

In:

Out:

Shahrdari Tabriz

In:

Out:

Tractor Sazi

In:

Out:

, Loan Return

Zob Ahan

In:

Out:

Azadegan League

Aboomoslem

In:

Out:

Aluminium Hormozgan

In:

Out:

Bargh Shiraz

In:

Out:

Damash Tehran

In:

Out:

Esteghlal Jonub

In:

Out:

Etka

In:

Out:

Foolad Yazd

In:

 

Out:

Gahar Zagros

In:

Out:

Gol Gohar

In:

Out:

Gostaresh Foolad

In:

Out:

Hamyari Arak

In:

Out:

Iranjavan

In:

Out:

Machine Sazi

In:

Out:

Mes Rafsanjan

In:

Out:

Naft Masjed Soleyman

In:

Out:

Nassaji

In:

Out:

Nirooye Zamini

In:

Out:

Pas Hamadan

In:

Out:

Payam Mashhad

In:

Out:

Payam Mokhaberat

In:

Out:

Paykan

In:

Out:

Saipa Shomal

In:

Out:

Sanati Kaveh

In:

Out:

Sanat Sari

In:

Out:

|other= to Tarbiat Yazd

Shahrdari Bandar Abbas

In:

Out:

Shahrdari Yasuj

In:

Out:

Shirin Faraz

In:

Out:

Steel Azin

In:

Out:

Tarbiat Yazd

In:

Out:

Notes and references

transfers
Football transfers summer 2011
2011